The United Liberal Party (ULP) is a political party in Zambia.

History

The ULP was formed in July 2006 by Sakwiba Sikota after he lost the United Party for National Development leadership contest. The party did not nominate a presidential candidate for the September 2006 general elections, but it received 2.4% of the vote for the National Assembly, winning three seats.

The party supported the Movement for Multi-Party Democracy's Rupiah Banda in the 2008 presidential by-election and 2011 general elections, but lost all three seats in the National Assembly in the 2011 elections after receiving just 131 votes.

References

Liberal parties in Africa
Political parties in Zambia
Political parties established in 2006
2006 establishments in Zambia